César Eduardo Portillo Brown (born September 26, 1968 in Barcelona, Anzoátegui) is a retired male basketball player (2.06 metres) from Venezuela, who played as a center during his career.

High school and college
Portillo attended high school in the United States at Miami High School in Miami, Florida.  There, Portillo led Miami High to a state title, with teammate and future NBA player Doug Edwards.  Portillo was named a Parade All-American as a senior.

After his standout high school career, César Portillo committed to the University of Florida.  His time there was cut short after only four games as his Scholastic Aptitude Test (SAT) came into question and he was asked to re-take the test.  Instead, Portillo transferred to Palm Beach Community College to play.

Following a junior college season where he averaged 19.5 points, 9.9 rebounds and 3.2 blocks per game, Portillo signed with the University of South Alabama.  Portillo played two years for South Alabama, leading them to the NCAA tournament as a junior.

International career
Portillo's first international experience came as a 14-year-old guard as he was a part of Venezuela's entry to the 1983 Pan American Games.  He later competed for the Venezuela national basketball team in his familiar post position at the 1989 Campeonato Sudamericano (4th place) and at the 1990 FIBA World Championship, where the team finished in 11th place.

References

External links
Profile

1968 births
Living people
Basketball players at the 1983 Pan American Games
Centers (basketball)
Cocodrilos de Caracas players
Florida Gators men's basketball players
Franca Basquetebol Clube players
Gaiteros del Zulia players
Junior college men's basketball players in the United States
Liga ACB players
Marinos B.B.C. players
Parade High School All-Americans (boys' basketball)
People from Barcelona, Venezuela
South Alabama Jaguars men's basketball players
Venezuelan expatriate basketball people in Brazil
Venezuelan expatriate basketball people in Spain
Venezuelan expatriate basketball people in the United States
Venezuelan men's basketball players
1990 FIBA World Championship players
Pan American Games competitors for Venezuela